TBP is an abbreviation for:

 Cap. FAP Pedro Canga Rodríguez Airport, Tumbes, Peru, IATA code
 Tau Beta Pi, the national engineering honor society
 Time-Bound Programmes for the Eradication of the Worst forms of Child Labour, of the International Labor Organization
 Tiong Bahru Plaza, a shopping mall in Singapore 
 The Brexit Party, British political party
 Tuas Biomedical Park, a biomedical manufacturing cluster in Tuas, Singapore
 To be provided, a placeholder variation of To be announced

In chemistry:
 TATA binding protein, a transcription factor
 Testosterone-binding protein, a glycoprotein
 2,4,6-Tribromophenol, a chemical compound
 Tributyl phosphate, a solvent